Wellesley Island State Park is a  state park located on Wellesley Island in the St. Lawrence River in the Town of Orleans in Jefferson County, New York. The park is divided into sections that are on different parts of the island. It has the largest camping complex in the Thousand Islands region, including wilderness campsites on the banks of the St. Lawrence accessible only by foot or boat.  The park is open year-round.

History
The Thousand Island State Park Commission began purchasing farmland on Wellesley Island in 1951, and opened Wellesley Island State Park in 1954. The park was preceded by two other state parks on Wellesley Island, Dewolf Point and Waterson Point, both of which were established in 1898 as part of the St. Lawrence Reservation.

In 2004, Reserve America named Wellesley Island State Park one of the top 100 campgrounds in the nation.

Activities and services
Wellesley Island State Park offers swimming at a life guarded beach, hiking, hunting and fishing, cross-country skiing, biking and recreation programs. The park includes a nature trail, the Minna Anthony Common Nature Center, a marina and three boat launches (power boats permitted), a nine-hole golf course, cabins, camping and a dump station, showers, picnic tables, a playground, and a food concession with attached recreation area. Several of the hiking trails overlook Eel Bay.  Archery and muzzle loading are allowed in designated areas.

See also
 List of New York state parks

References

External links

 Wellesley Island State Park
 Minna Anthony Common Nature Center
 Friends of the Nature Center

State parks of New York (state)
IUCN Category V
Parks in Jefferson County, New York
Nature centers in New York (state)